Frisch is a surname. Notable people with the surname include:

Aileen Frisch, South Korean luger
Arno Frisch, Austrian actor
Cyrus Frisch, Dutch film director
David Frisch (American football), American football player
David H. Frisch (1918–1991), American physicist
Deborah Frisch, American psychologist
Frankie Frisch (1898–1973), American baseball player
Irene Frisch (born 1931), Holocaust survivor and author
Johan Dalgas Frisch (born 1930), Brazilian engineer and ornithologist
Johann Leonhard Frisch (1666–1743), German linguist, entomologist and ornithologist
Karl von Frisch (1886–1982), Austrian ethologist
Martin Frisch (1899–1959), Hungarian/American mechanical engineer
Max Frisch, Swiss playwright, and novelist
Morten Frisch, Danish epidemiologist
Otto Robert Frisch (1904–1979), Austrian-British physicist
Ragnar Anton Kittil Frisch (1895–1979), Norwegian economist
Uriel Frisch (born 1940), French mathematical physicist

See also 
 Frisch family, a Norwegian family whose most famous member is Ragnar Frisch
 Frisch School, a Modern Orthodox Jewish day school in Paramus, New Jersey
 Frisk

German-language surnames
Jewish surnames